Kurland may refer to:

People

Abraham Kurland (1912-1999), Danish Olympic medalist in wrestling
Ben Kurland, American actor
Bob Kurland, American basketball center
Cys Kurland, South African footballer
Gilbert Kurland, American sound engineer and production manager
Justine Kurland, American fine art photographer
Lynn Kurland, American author
Michael Kurland, American author
Peter Kurland, American motion picture sound mixer
Sheldon Kurland, American violinist and musical arranger

Places
Courland (German: Kurland), a region of Latvia
Curland, a village and civil parish in Somerset, England
Duchy of Courland and Semigallia, a former duchy in the Baltic region
Kurland, Norway, village in Akershus, Norway

See also
Courland (disambiguation)